The Egyptian hieroglyph ndj (nḏ) (Gardiner Aa27, U+13429 𓐩) has the shape of a cross.
It presumably depicts some type of tool such as a mill. It is often written alongside the nu "pot" hieroglyph (W24).
It is used as an ideogram or determinative in the context of "grains", "grinding stone", "grind", "to rub out".

Budge's dictionary to the Book of the Dead has the following uses for the hieroglyph:
1—(nos 1,2,4)-"to protect, guard, avenge", and "protector, advocate, avenger"
2—(no. 3)-"homage to thee", (a form of salutation to gods)
3—(nos. 5,6,7)-"discuss a matter with someone", "to converse", "to take counsel"; (uses the 'man-seated hieroglyph' for 'concepts', or 'speech', no. A2) A2

Budge's two-volume dictionary has entries for "rub out" and "grind", both connected to Coptic language words. Of the thirty-three entries, six refer to these two definitions. Entry 24 refers to the Coptic word (n-o-u-t)-(nout), and 29 to (n-o-e-i-t)-(); dictionary entry 24 has seven spellings using determinatives for "grinding", the "block-of-stone" hieroglyph), no. 39, N39, or the "man grinding" hieroglyph, no. 34 (actually unlisted, a man grinding upon a stone-block-mortar), A36

Entry 29, (six spellings, and Coptic word), uses the small circle for grain, no. N33B, N33B, or the plural of grains, N33B-N33B-N33B; also another grain production hieroglyph, nos. U9, U10, U9-(or)-U10

See also

Gardiner's Sign List#Aa. Unclassified
Gardiner's Sign List#U. Agriculture, Crafts, and Professions
List of Egyptian hieroglyphs

References

Budge, 1978, (1920).  An Egyptian Hieroglyphic Dictionary, E.A.Wallace Budge, (Dover Publications), c 1978, (c 1920), Dover edition, c 1978; cliv-(154) and 1314 pp. (In two volumes) (softcover)
Budge, 1991.  A Hieroglyphic Dictionary to the Book of the Dead, E.A.Wallace Budge, Dover edition, 1991; Original: c 1911 as: A Hieroglyphic Vocabulary to the Theban Recension of the Book of the Dead with an Index to All the English Equivalents of the Egyptian Words, (Kegan Paul, etc. Ltd, London, publisher). Dover: (softcover)
Budge. The Rosetta Stone, E.A.Wallace Budge, (Dover Publications), c 1929, Dover edition(unabridged), 1989. (softcover)
Collier, Mark and Manley, Bill, How to Read Egyptian Hieroglyphs, c 1998, University of California Press, 179 pp, (with a word Glossary, p 151-61: Title Egyptian-English vocabulary; also an "Answer Key", 'Key to the exercises', p 162-73) {hardcover, }
Schumann-Antelme, and Rossini, 1998. Illustrated Hieroglyphics Handbook, Ruth Schumann-Antelme, and Stéphane Rossini. c 1998, English trans. 2002, Sterling Publishing Co. (Index, Summary lists (tables), selected uniliterals, biliterals, and triliterals.) (softcover)

Egyptian hieroglyphs: unclassified